Pitfour may refer to:

Pitfour estate, Aberdeenshire, Scotland, seat of the Fergusons of Pitfour
Pitfour Castle, Perth and Kinross, Scotland
James Ferguson, 1st Laird of Pitfour (1672-1734), Scottish lawyer
James Ferguson, Lord Pitfour (1700–1777), Scottish advocate, 2nd Laird
James Ferguson (Scottish politician) (1735-1820), Scottish advocate and politician, 3rd Laird
George Ferguson (Lt Governor of Tobago) (1748-1820), 4th Laird